Sherlock Holmes ~ The Way of All Flesh is a novella written by Daniel Ward.  It is a Sherlock Holmes pastiche, first published by Classic Mysteries, a small press dedicated to new mystery writers, in 2004.  It was published again a year later by the Linford Mystery Series, an imprint of Ulverscroft.  In September 2010, the novel was made available to download on Kindle.

Plot summary 

Sherlock Holmes is called in to investigate when the body of an Italian diplomat is discovered in the River Thames, his torso horrifically mutilated. Fearing the political repercussions - the diplomat being in London to initiate talks regarding a secret naval treaty between the two nations - the Government entrust Holmes with the delicate task of uncovering the truth behind the brutal murder. Events take a shocking turn, however, when a young solicitor is found slain in the East End, his body similarly mutilated.

Reviews 
Sherlock Holmes Society of London

2004 British novels
British mystery novels
British novellas
Sherlock Holmes pastiches
Novels set in London